Assais-les-Jumeaux is a commune in the Deux-Sèvres department in the Nouvelle-Aquitaine region in western France.

Sights
 Saint-Martin d'Assais Church which has kept its original bell tower, listed in 1929 as historical monument.
 19th Saint-Martin des Jumeaux church, with bell-tower porch.
 Tumulus de la Motte de Puytaillé, classified in 1970 as historical monument.

See also
Communes of the Deux-Sèvres department

References

Communes of Deux-Sèvres